Upsilon Pi Epsilon: International Honor Society for the Computing and Information Disciplines, is the first honor society dedicated to the discipline of the computing and information disciplines.  Informally known as UPE, Upsilon Pi Epsilon was founded on January 10, 1967 at Texas A&M University and has chartered over 270 chapters at college campuses around the world. With the rise of importance of information technology to many fields, other honorary societies have added computer science to their traditional scope.

About 
Upsilon Pi Epsilon is endorsed by the Association for Computing Machinery (ACM) and the Institute of Electrical and Electronics Engineers Computer Society (IEEE-CS), the two largest computer organizations in the world. Aside from conferring honor on computer science and computer engineering students, it has a large involvement with the ACM International Collegiate Programming Contest.  UPE is a member of the ACHS - Association of College Honor Societies.

Membership in UPE, like many other honor societies, is lifetime. Newly inducted student members get a free year of ACM student-level membership as well.  Additionally, UPE gives out a number of scholarships for its members and those who are active student members of the ACM or IEEE-CS.

References

External links
 UPE Homepage
  ACHS Upsilon Pi Epsilon entry
  Upsilon Pi Epsilon chapter list at ACHS

Association of College Honor Societies
Honor societies
Student organizations established in 1967
1967 establishments in Texas